Philip Timothy Kelly (August 29, 1901 – July 24, 1985) was a politician in Ontario, Canada. He was a Progressive Conservative member of the Legislative Assembly of Ontario from 1951 to 1958 who represented the northern Ontario riding of Cochrane North. He was a cabinet minister in the government of Leslie Frost. He was implicated in the Northern Ontario Natural Gas and was forced to resign from cabinet.

Background
Kelly was born in Baysville in Northern Ontario, the son of Timothy Kelly and Mary Tooke. He went to school in Bracebridge and worked as an accountant for Abitibi Power and Paper Company for twenty years. He and his wife Ethel raised four children.

Politics
He was elected in the 1951 provincial election in the riding of Cochrane North. He defeated Liberal candidate J.A. Habel by 476 votes. He was re-elected in 1955. In 1952, he was appointed as Minister of Mines by Premier Leslie Frost during a minor cabinet shuffle.

Northern Ontario Natural Gas
In the early 1950s, Trans-Canada Pipeline was building a natural gas pipeline eastward across Canada. When it reached Ontario, it said that it would not build branch pipelines to individual communities and sought local Ontario companies to provide that service. Kelly's nephew, Gordon McLean co-founded a company called Northern Ontario Natural Gas (NONG) to supply natural gas to northern Ontario communities. While Kelly did not own shares in the company, he gave $5,000 to McLean for startup funds in NONG and made an agreement with McLean to share any profits.

When TCPL announced their intention to build the pipeline through Ontario, Premier Frost recognized this as a prominent issue and order his cabinet not to become financially involved in the pipeline business. Kelly ignored this directive and in addition gave advice to fellow cabinet ministers Clare Mapledoram and William Griesinger to purchase shares in the company. He also shared the advice with John Wintermeyer who was leader of the Ontario Liberal Party.

By 1957, NONG had cornered the natural gas market in Northern Ontario. Shares in the company were split 500 to 1. Kelly's initial investment of $5,000 soared to $500,000. Kelly and McLean's investment became so involved that they created holding company called Kelmac Oils to help manage their money. Word of Kelly's business dealings reached the Premier's office who felt that "it was not appropriate for the Minister of Mines to dispense 'hot tips'". On July 8, 1957, Frost ordered Kelly to come to his office and asked for his resignation from cabinet. Reports in the newspapers at the time said that Kelly cited business pressures as the reason. He later admitted that the NONG situation was the real reason for leaving cabinet. Some reports said that Frost had Kelly's resignation already typed up before the meeting but Kelly wrote the resignation himself.

News of NONG became public in March 1958 when Donald MacDonald the leader of the Ontario CCF accused Frost of collusion in the affair. Frost denied the allegations but information about the stock holdings of his cabinet ministers was revealed. Kelly resigned his seat in January 1958.

Cabinet posts

Later life
After leaving the Ontario legislature, Kelly attempted to run as a candidate in the upcoming federal election but he failed to win a nomination. In 1965, he became leader of the provincial Social Credit party for a brief period, and ran unsuccessfully as an independent candidate in the riding of Cochrane in the 1965 federal election.

He moved to Smooth Rock Falls near Cochrane where he bought and operated a hotel. He served as a town councillor for seven years and was mayor for two terms. He died in 1985 at the age of 83.

References

External links
 

1901 births
1985 deaths
Members of the Executive Council of Ontario
Progressive Conservative Party of Ontario MPPs